Shyam Metalics and Energy Ltd. (SMEL) is an Indian metal producing company, headquartered in Kolkata, West Bengal. The company produces long product structural steel, ferro alloys, pellet and sponge iron. It currently operates three manufacturing plants that are located at Sambalpur in Odisha, and Jamuria and Mangalpur in West Bengal.

SMEL got listed at Bombay Stock Exchange and National Stock Exchange of India on 24 June 2021.

History 

 1991: Incorporation of Shyam SEL and Power Ltd. (SSPL).
 2002: Commercial production started at Sponge Iron plant in Mangalpur, with 0.06 MTPA capacity.
 2013: Commercial production started at Sponge Iron plant Sambalpur, with 0.3 MTPA capacity.
 2013: Commercial production started at Iron Pellets, Billetes and Sponge Iron plant in Jamuria, with 0.59 MTPA capacity. Expanded capacity of Sponge Iron plant Jamuria.
 2014: Boosted the capacity of Ferro Alloy products, and the Sponge Iron plant at Sambalpur by 0.13 MTPA.
 2014: Established Captive Railway Siding at Jamuria manufacturing plant.
 2015: Captive railway siding operationalized at Sambalpur plant.
 2015: Another Captive Power plant commissioned at Jamuria. Growth in capacity of Sponge Iron and Billets plant by 0.38 MTPA, and Ferro Alloys products by 9 MTPA.
 2016: Increased aggregate capacity of Billets at Sambalpur by 0.27 MTPA.
 2016: Boosted the capacity of Iron Pellets and Billets plant located at Jamuria by 0.80 MTPA.
 2017: Expanded capacity of Sponge Iron and Billets plant at Sambalpur by 0.96 MTPA. Annual capacity including all intermediate products reached 2.90 MTPA.
2019: Expanded capacity of Sponge Iron, Billets, TMT and Wire Rods at Sambalpur by 1.81 MTPA.
 2019: Increased capacity of Sponge Iron, Billets, Long products and Ferro Alloy products at Jamuria by 1.09 MTPA. Expanded the capacity of Captive Power Plant by 94 MW.
 2020: Boosted the capacity of Pellets at Sambalpur plant by 1.2 MTPA. Expanded capacity of Captive Power Plant by 118 MW.
 2020: Further improved the capacity of Pellets, Sponge Iron, Billets and Long Products at Jamuria plant by 2.64 MTPA. Combined annual capacity of 5.71 MTPA reached.
 2021: Expanded capacity of TMT and Wire Rods further. Annual capacity, including all intermediate products, reached 5.71 MTPA.

Shareholding 
As on 30 June 2022, promoters of Shyam Metalics and Energy Ltd. held 88.35% shares in the company.

Financials 
The company reported total income of Rs.10453.96 crores during the Financial Year ended March 31, 2022 as compared to Rs.6320.79 crores during the Financial Year ended March 31, 2021.

There was a net profit of Rs.1724.51 crores reported for the Financial Year ended March 31, 2022 as against net profit of Rs.843.36 crores for the Financial Year ended March 31, 2021.

Expansion and acquisition 
Shyam Metalics has embarked on a 'diversification approach' in the metal space to chart the company's growth journey and has proposed to further invest Rs 7500 crore over the next five years. In order to meet the growth plans with organic and inorganic expansion, SMEL's present Capex aims at growing to Rs. 10000 crore in the next five years. The current manufacturing plants in West Bengal and Odisha which employs more than 15000 people will further see an addition of 10000 jobs to the entire workforce post expansions.

 2021: SMEL made a successful acquisition in the aluminum foil metal space and then successfully implemented one of India's largest Aluminium Foil Rolling Plant in India in the State of West Bengal. The acquisition of Sri Venkateshwara, a small Aluminium Foil plant in Giridh with an annual capacity of 3600 MTPA has hugely benefited the setting up of the Aluminium Foil Rolling mill complex to manufacture Quality Products with an annual rolling capacity of 40000 MT per annum.
 2022: The company also took control of Ramsarup Industries through NCLT which helped them facilitate inorganic growth in the steel space. Following the takeover of Ramsarup Industries in May 2022, Shyam Metalics had aims at enhancing and reviving the operations and steel-making manufacturing facilities of Ramsarup Industries at Kharagpur. Fresh planning for revival aided with the deployment of capital will lead to the generation of 3000 new jobs and facilitate the growth of the company the state and its people.
 2022: Shyam Metalics & Energy on 20 December 2022 announced their acquisition of Mittal Corp with a foray into the Stainless Steel (SS) / Wire Rod & Bar Mill business. The matter is subjudice and shall be resolved in due course. This inorganic growth will witness the establishment of manufacturing footprints in the state of Madhya Pradesh and add capacities of 1,50,000 tpa Stainless Steel (SS) / Wire Rod & Bar Mill. Ferro Alloys a key input material for Stainless Steel is extensively produced by the company's existing companies. The Government has mandated a minimum 20% use of stainless steel in Coastal Areas which ensures a very stable demand for these products.

References 

Manufacturing companies based in Kolkata
Companies listed on the Bombay Stock Exchange
Companies listed on the National Stock Exchange of India
Steel companies of India